Discography of releases by The Waterboys and Mike Scott.

The Waterboys

Studio albums

Collector's edition studio albums

Live albums

Compilation albums

Extended plays

Singles

Promotional singles
 (1989) "World Party"
 (1990) "A Life of Sundays"
 (1993) "Preparing to Fly"

Mike Scott

Studio albums

Singles

Promotional singles
 (1998) "Questions"

Other releases

DNV singles
 (1979) "Death in Venice"

Another Pretty Face singles
 (1979) "All the Boys Love Carrie"
 (1980) "Whatever Happened to the West?"
 (1980) "Heaven Gets Closer Everyday"
 (1981) "Soul to Soul"

Funhouse singles
 (1982) "Out of Control"

References

Discography
Waterboys, The